Steven H. Miles is an American doctor, author, and professor of medicine who has published on ethically topics relating to medicine and the use of torture.

Miles is a practicing physician and Professor of Medicine at the University of Minnesota Medical School and is a member of its Center for Bioethics. He is a recipient of the Distinguished Service Award of the American Society of Bioethics and Humanistics. Miles is a fellow of the Hastings Center, an independent bioethics research institution.

Miles is the author of two books on medical ethics, one focusing  on the Hippocratic Oath, the other on physicians and torture.

Selected bibliography
 Steven H. Miles, The Hippocratic Oath and the Ethics of Medicine, Oxford University Press, 2004
 Steven H. Miles, Oath Betrayed: America's Torture Doctors, University of California Press, April 20, 2009, .

See also
Lists of books
Lists of authors
Bioethics

References

External links

Living people
Physicians from Minnesota
University of Minnesota faculty
Hastings Center Fellows
Year of birth missing (living people)